Ade Iwan Setiawan (born March 19, 1984) is an Indonesian footballer who currently plays for Persebaya Surabaya in the Liga Indonesia Premier Division.

Club career statistics

References

External links

1984 births
Association football defenders
Living people
Indonesian footballers
Liga 1 (Indonesia) players
Persiwa Wamena players
Indonesian Premier Division players
Persih Tembilahan players
Persikabo Bogor players